"Stand or Fall" is a song by new wave/rock band the Fixx. Released in 1982, it was the third of four single releases from the group's debut album, Shuttered Room.  

"Stand or Fall" became the group's first charting hit. In the United States, it peaked at number 76 on the Billboard Hot 100 singles chart and number 7 on the Top Rock Tracks chart. The song also charted in Australia (No. 33), Canada (No. 37) and the United Kingdom (No. 54).

Charts

References

External links
  

The Fixx songs
1982 songs
1982 singles
Song recordings produced by Rupert Hine
MCA Records singles
British new wave songs